Lawrence Atkinson (1873–1931) was an English artist, musician and poet.

Early life
Atkinson was born at Chorlton upon Medlock, near Manchester, on 17 January 1873. He began by moving to Paris and studying musical composition, but moved back to London and began to paint, apparently painting mainly landscapes in a style influenced by Matisse and the Fauves (almost all of these works are lost).

Vorticism
His style changed radically when he was introduced to the work of Wyndham Lewis and the vorticists. He also wrote poetry, in a Modernist style.

Death
Atkinson died in Paris on 21 September 1931.

References

External links

Wheels at The Modernist Journals Project

1873 births
1931 deaths
Writers from Manchester
Musicians from Manchester
19th-century English painters
English male painters
20th-century English painters
Vorticists
English male poets
20th-century English male artists
19th-century English male artists